Lajos Balthazár (30 June 1921 – 1 February 1995) was a Hungarian fencer. He won a silver medal in the team épée event at the 1956 Summer Olympics.

References

External links
 

1921 births
1995 deaths
Hungarian male épée fencers
Olympic fencers of Hungary
Fencers at the 1948 Summer Olympics
Fencers at the 1952 Summer Olympics
Fencers at the 1956 Summer Olympics
Olympic silver medalists for Hungary
Olympic medalists in fencing
Martial artists from Budapest
Medalists at the 1956 Summer Olympics
20th-century Hungarian people